The Institute of Astronomy of the Russian Academy of Sciences was known as the Astronomical Council of the Academy of Sciences USSR until 1990.

Overview
The institute is involved in developing and launching space-based astronomy platforms, and scientific research that investigates the origins of stars, solar systems, and galactic formations. It also contains several large databases and catalogs related to astronomical and astrophysical data, literature, and applications.  Its space based research includes projects on national and international cooperative scales.

This institute also organizes and co-sponsors conferences, international conferences, meetings, and seminars related to its research areas. The institute also contains the Library for Natural Sciences of the Russian Academy of Sciences (LNS RAS), founded in 1947.

In addition, an extensive body of published scientific literature has been published over the years.

Library
The institute library holds foreign literature, besides Russian literature, of the 18th through the 21st centuries. The topics of interest are: astronomy, physics mathematics, mechanics, Earth sciences, cosmonautics, and electronics. The library consists of 60,000 items consisting of 10,000 books and 50,000 periodicals.

References

Astronomy institutes and departments
Astronomy in the Soviet Union
Institutes of the Russian Academy of Sciences
Physics societies in Russia
Research institutes in the Soviet Union
Research institutes established in 1947
Science and technology in Russia